Joaquín Ochoa Giménez (born 1 September 1996) is an Argentine professional footballer who plays as a midfielder for Uruguayan club Racing Club de Montevideo, on loan from Atlanta.

Career
Ochoa Giménez's career began with Atlanta. He made his debut in professional football under manager Fernando Ruiz on 11 March 2017, coming off the bench in place of Nahuel Peralta during a draw at home to Colegiales. Seven more appearances followed in Primera B Metropolitana in 2016–17. Ochoa Giménez scored his first goal during a win away to Deportivo Español in September 2017, with a goal versus Barracas Central following in March 2018; an opponent he netted against again a year later.

Career statistics
.

References

External links

1996 births
Living people
Argentine footballers
Argentine expatriate footballers
Footballers from Buenos Aires
Association football midfielders
Primera B Metropolitana players
Uruguayan Segunda División players
Club Atlético Atlanta footballers
Racing Club de Montevideo players
Argentine expatriate sportspeople in Uruguay
Expatriate footballers in Uruguay